Ibipinabant (SLV319, BMS-646,256) is a drug used in scientific research which acts as a potent and highly selective CB1 antagonist. It has potent anorectic effects in animals, and was researched for the treatment of obesity, although CB1 antagonists as a class have now fallen out of favour as potential anorectics following the problems seen with rimonabant, and so ibipinabant is now only used for laboratory research, especially structure-activity relationship studies into novel CB1 antagonists. SLV330, which is a structural analogue of Ibipinabant, was reported active in animal models related to the regulation of memory, cognition, as well as in addictive behavior. An atom-efficient synthesis of ibipinabant has been reported.

See also 
 Cannabinoid receptor antagonist

References 

Cannabinoids
CB1 receptor antagonists
Chloroarenes
Pyrazolines
Abandoned drugs